Oliver A. Caswell (May 26, 1826 – May 1, 1885) was a member of the Wisconsin State Assembly.

Biography
Caswell was born on May 26, 1826 in Norwich, Connecticut. Later, he settled in Mount Sterling, Wisconsin. He died at his home near Mount Sterling in 1885 and is buried in McAuley-Halls-Branch Pioneer Cemetery.

His great-great-grandson Stuart A. Halsan became a member of the Washington House of Representatives and the Washington State Senate.

Career
Caswell was a member of the Assembly in 1872. He was a member of the Democratic Party. He also served as the deputy sheriff of Crawford County for 12 years and was the town chairman.

References

See also
The Political Graveyard

Politicians from Norwich, Connecticut
People from Mount Sterling, Wisconsin
Democratic Party members of the Wisconsin State Assembly
1826 births
1885 deaths
19th-century American politicians